The Japan–Korea Treaty of 1876 (also known as the Japan-Korea Treaty of Amity in Japan and the Treaty of Ganghwa Island in Korea) was made between representatives of the Empire of Japan and the Korean Kingdom of Joseon in 1876. Negotiations were concluded on February 26, 1876.

In Korea, Heungseon Daewongun, who instituted a policy of increased isolationism against the European powers, was forced into retirement by his son King Gojong and Gojong's wife, Empress Myeongseong. France and the United States had already made several unsuccessful attempts to begin commerce with the Joseon dynasty during the Daewongun's era. However, after he was removed from power, many new officials who supported the idea of opening commerce with foreigners took power. While there was political instability, Japan developed a plan to open and exert influence on Korea before a European power could. In 1875, their plan was put into action: the Un'yō, a small Japanese warship, was dispatched to present a show of force and survey coastal waters without Korean permission.

Background

Ascendancy of the Daewongun
In January 1864, King Cheoljong died without an heir, and Gojong ascended the throne at the age of 12. However, King Gojong was too young and the new king's father, Yi Ha-ŭng, became the Daewongun or lord of the great court and ruled Korea in his son's name. Originally the term Daewongun referred to any person who was not actually the king but whose son took the throne. The Daewongun initiated reforms to strengthen the monarchy at the expense of the yangban class.

Even before the nineteenth century, the Koreans had only maintained diplomatic relations with its suzerain China and with neighboring Japan. Foreign trade was mainly limited to China conducted at designated locations along the China–Korea border, and with Japan through the waegwan in Pusan. By the mid-nineteenth century Westerners had come to refer to Korea as the Hermit Kingdom. The Daewongun was determined to continue Korea's traditional isolationist policy and to purge the kingdom of any foreign ideas that had infiltrated the nation. The disastrous events occurring in China, including the First (1839–1842) and Second Opium wars (1856–1860), reinforced his determination to separate Korea from the rest of the world.

Western encroachment
From the early to mid-nineteenth century Western vessels began to make frequent appearances in Korean waters, surveying sea routes and seeking trade. The Korean government was extremely wary and referred to these vessels as strange-looking ships. Consequently, several incidents took place. In June 1832, a ship from the East India Company, the Lord Amherst, appeared off the coast of Hwanghae Province seeking trade but was refused. In June 1845 another British warship, surveyed the coast of Cheju-do and Chŏlla province. The following month the Korean government filed a protest with British authorities in Guangzhou through the Chinese government. In June 1846, three French warships dropped anchor off the coast of Chungcheong Province and conveyed a letter protesting persecution of Catholics in the country. In April 1854, two armed Russian vessels sailed along the eastern coast of Hamgyong Province, causing some deaths and injuries among the Koreans they encountered. The incident prompted the Korean government to issue a ban forbidding the people of the province from having any contact with foreign vessels. In January and July 1866, ships manned by the German adventurer Ernst J. Oppert appeared off the coast of Chungcheong Province, seeking trade. In August 1866, an American merchant ship, the General Sherman, appeared off the coast of Pyongan Province, steaming along the Taedong River to the provincial capital of Pyongyang, and asked permission to trade. Local officials refused to enter into trade talks and demanded the ship's departure. A Korean official was then taken hostage aboard the vessel and its crew members fired guns at enraged Korean officials and civilians onshore. The crew then landed ashore and plundered the town in the process killing seven Koreans. The governor of the province Pak Kyu-su ordered his forces to destroy the ship. During this event, the General Sherman ran aground on a sandbar and Korean forces burned the ship and killed the ship's entire crew of 23. In 1866 after the execution of several of its Catholic missionaries and Korean Catholics, the French launched a punitive expedition against Korea. Five years later in 1871, the Americans also launched an expedition to Korea. Despite this, the Koreans continued to adhere to isolationism and refused to negotiate to open up the country.

Japanese attempts to establish relations with Korea
During the Edo period, Japan's relations and trade with Korea were conducted through intermediaries with the Sō family in Tsushima. A Japanese outpost called the waegwan was allowed to be maintained in Tongnae near Pusan. The traders were confined to the outpost and no Japanese were allowed to travel to the Korean capital at Seoul. During the aftermath of the Meiji restoration in late 1868, a member of the Sō daimyō informed the Korean authorities that a new government had been established and an envoy would be sent from Japan. In 1869 the envoy from the Meiji government arrived in Korea carrying a letter requesting to establish a goodwill mission between the two countries; the letter contained the seal of the Meiji government rather than the seals authorized by the Korean Court for the Sō family to use. It also used the character ko (皇) rather than taikun (大君) to refer to the Japanese emperor. The Koreans only used this character to refer to the Chinese emperor, and to the Koreans it implied ceremonial superiority to the Korean monarch which would make the Korean monarch a vassal or subject of the Japanese ruler. The Japanese were however just reacting to their domestic political situation where the Shogun had been replaced by the emperor. The Koreans remained in the sinocentric world where China was at the center of interstate relations and as a result refused to receive the envoy. The bureau of foreign affairs wanted to change these arrangements to one based on modern state-to-state relations.

Ganghwa incident

On the morning of September 20, 1875, the Japanese gunboat  began surveying the Western coast of Korea. The ship reached Ganghwa Island, which had been a site of violent confrontations between the Koreans and foreign forces during the previous decade. The memories of those confrontations were very fresh, and there was little question that the Korean garrison would shoot at any approaching foreign ship. Nonetheless, Commander Inoue ordered a small boat to launch and put ashore a party on Kanghwa Island to request water and provisions. The Korean forts opened fire. The Un'yō brought its superior firepower to bear and silenced the Korean guns. After bombarding the Korean fortifications, the shore party torched several houses on the island and exchanged fire with Korean troops. The Japanese were armed with rifles and quickly routed the Koreans who carried matchlock muskets. Thirty-five Korean soldiers were left dead. The Un'yo then attacked another Korean fort on Yeongjong Island and withdrew back to Japan.

News of the incident only reached the Japanese government eight days later on September 28, and the following day the government decided to dispatch warships to Pusan to protect Japanese residents there. There were also debates within the Japanese government as to whether or not to send a mission to Korea to settle the incident.

Treaty provisions

Japan and Korea signed the 'Japan Korea Treaty of Amity' on 26 February 1876. Japan employed gunboat diplomacy to press Korea to sign this unequal treaty. The pact opened up Korea, as Commodore Matthew Perry's fleet of Black Ships had opened up Japan in 1853. According to the treaty, it ended Joseon's status as a tributary state of the Qing dynasty and opened three ports to Japanese trade. The Treaty also granted the Japanese people many of the same rights in Korea that Westerners enjoyed in Japan, such as extraterritoriality.

The chief treaty negotiators were Kuroda Kiyotaka, Director of the Hokkaidō Colonization Office, and Shin Heon, General/Minister of Joseon-dynasty Korea.

The articles of the treaty were as follows:
Article 1 stated that Korea was a free nation, "an independent state enjoying the same sovereign rights as does Japan". 
Article 2 stipulated that Japan and Korea would exchange envoys within fifteen months and permanently maintain diplomatic missions in each country. The Japanese would confer with the Ministry of Rites; the Korean envoy would be received by the Foreign Office.
Under Article 3, Japan would use the Japanese and Hanmun in diplomatic communiques. And Korea would use Hanmun.
Article 4 terminated Tsushima's centuries-old role as a diplomatic intermediary by abolishing all agreements then existing between Korea and Tsushima.
In addition to the open port of Pusan, Article 5 authorized the search in Kyongsang, Kyonggi, Chungcheong, Cholla, and Hamgyong provinces for two more suitable seaports for Japanese trade to be opened in October 1877.
Article 6 secured aid and support for ships stranded or wrecked along the Korea or Japanese coasts.
Article 7 permitted any Japanese mariner to conduct surveys and mapping operations at will in the seas off the Korean Peninsula's coastline.
Article 8 permitted Japanese merchants residence, unhindered trade, and the right to lease land and buildings for those purposes in the open ports.
Article 9 guaranteed the freedom to conduct business without interference from either government and to trade without restrictions or prohibitions.
Article 10 granted Japan the right of extraterritoriality, the one feature of previous Western treaties that was most widely resented in Asia. It not only gave foreigners a free rein to commit crimes with relative impunity, but its inclusion implied the grantor nation's system of law was either primitive, unjust, or both.

Aftermath

The following year saw a Japanese fleet led by Special Envoy Kuroda Kiyotaka coming over to Joseon, demanding an apology from the Korean government and a commercial treaty between the two nations. The Korean government decided to accept the demand, in the hope of importing some technologies to defend the country from any future invasions.

However, the treaty would eventually turn out to be the first of many unequal treaties signed by Korea; It gave extraterritorial rights to Japanese citizens in Korea, and forced the Korean government to open 3 ports to Japan, specifically Busan, Incheon and Wonsan. With the signing of its first unequal treaty, Korea became vulnerable to the influence of imperialistic powers; and later the treaty led Korea to be annexed by Japan.

See also
History of Korea
Japan–Korea disputes
General Sherman incident (1866)
French campaign against Korea (1866)
United States expedition to Korea (1871)
Ganghwa Island incident (1875)
Capitulation (treaty)

References

Citations

Sources

 
 

Chung, Young-lob. (2005). Korea Under Siege, 1876–1945: Capital Formation and Economic Transformation. New York: Oxford University Press. ; OCLC 156412277
Korean Mission to the Conference on the Limitation of Armament, Washington, D.C., 1921–1922. (1922). Korea's Appeal to the Conference on Limitation of Armament. Washington: U.S. Government Printing Office. OCLC 12923609
United States. Dept. of State. (1919). Catalogue of treaties: 1814–1918. Washington: Government Printing Office. OCLC 3830508

Further reading
McDougall, Walter (1993). Let the Sea Make a Noise: Four Hundred Years of Cataclysm, Conquest, War and Folly in the North Pacific. New York: Avon Books. ; OCLC 152400671

1876 in Japan
1876 in Korea
Japan–Korea relations
Unequal treaties
Ganghwa
Ganghwa
1876 treaties
February 1876 events
Bilateral treaties of Japan